An election of Members of the European Parliament from Hungary to the European Parliament was held on 25 May 2014.

With the Lisbon Treaty coming into force, Hungary held 22 seats in the European Parliament. However, because Croatia joined the EU in 2013, it now holds 21 seats to the Parliament.

Electoral system

Parties contesting the election

Eight Hungarian parties took part in the European elections:

 MSZP – Magyar Szocialista Párt (Hungarian Socialist Party)
 SMS – Seres Mária Szövetségei (Alliance of Mária Seres)
 Fidesz–KDNP – Fidesz-Magyar Polgári Szövetség – Kereszténydemokrata Néppárt (Fidesz–Hungarian Civic Alliance – Christian Democratic People's Party)
 HNEM – A Haza Nem Eladó Mozgalom Párt) (The Homeland Not For Sale Movement Party)
 Jobbik – Jobbik Magyarországért Mozgalom (Movement for a Better Hungary)
 LMP – Lehet Más a Politika (Politics Can Be Different)
 Együtt–PM – Együtt-A Korszakváltók Pártja – Párbeszéd Magyarországért Párt (Together–Party for a New Era – Dialogue for Hungary)
 DK – Demokratikus Koalíció (Democratic Coalition)

Three parties were refused registration: Democratic Community of Welfare and Freedom (JESZ), Modern Hungary Movement (MoMa), and New Hungary Party (ÚMP).

Opinion polling

Results

By county and in the diaspora

Analysis and consequences
Fidesz won with second highest proportion of votes in Europe, after the Labour Party in Malta. Prime Minister Viktor Orbán congratulated to all elected MEPs. He said "they will be outpost of the Hungarians as they will defend the home in foreign land". The ruling party received 12 seats, strongly enhancing the European People's Party (EPP) drive to achieve a majority in the European Parliament. Martin Schulz, S&D candidate for President of the European Commission, said the People's Party could win the election just because of the "eurosceptic and populist" Forza Italia and Fidesz results, which is "embarrassing for the conservatives". German Vice-Chancellor Sigmar Gabriel also called the Fidesz "extremist". Deputy Prime Minister Zsolt Semjén rejected Gabriel's statements and noted "he does not remember that Gabriel had spoken against when Robert Fico's Smer entered into a coalition with the fascist Ján Slota-led Slovak National Party".

The Hungarian Socialist Party (MSZP) suffered its largest  defeat since the 1990 parliamentary election, while far-right Jobbik came to the second place for the first time since its establishment. Gábor Vona said his party, based on the results, could be the main challenger to the Fidesz in the 2018 parliamentary election. However, as political analyst Zoltán Lakner argued, Jobbik appeared in the election significantly worse than one month ago in the general election, because the party now gained only one-third of those votes, while the turnout was half of the previous one. The extremist party's second place was due to the fragmentation of the left-wing opposition.

After the obvious failure, chairman Attila Mesterházy and the entire presidium of the Socialist Party tendered their resignation. Nevertheless, Mesterházy said he wishes to keep his position of parliamentary group leader. However, three days later, Mesterházy resigned from both of his positions after criticism intensified against him. The Socialist Party lost its leading opposition stature in Budapest, dropping to fourth place there after the Democratic Coalition and the alliance of Together 2014–Dialogue for Hungary. That rearrangement of the balance of power may affect the distribution of the candidates among the three parties for the 2014 local elections (primarily a possible joint candidate against Mayor of Budapest István Tarlós). Gábor Török, a popular political scientist in Hungary, called the election the "Mohács disaster of the Socialist Party".

The two newer organisations, led by two former prime ministers, Ferenc Gyurcsány and Gordon Bajnai, could assess their strength for the first time during a single candidacy. According to Index.hu, successful results helped the political survival of Gyurcsány and Bajnai. The latter's party proved popular among the liberal voters in Budapest, while the DK weakened the Socialists' stronghold in countryside. However, the news portals' analysis pointed out that Gyurcsány's party has no more reserves, the relative good result was due to the dedicated "believers" and maximum mobilisation coupled with low turnout. According to the analysis, Politics Can Be Different (LMP) remained a party with 5%, narrowly meeting the electoral threshold.

List of seat winners

On the Fidesz–KDNP list:
Ildikó Pelczné Gáll
József Szájer
László Tőkés
Tamás Deutsch
András Gyürk
Kinga Gál
György Schöpflin
Norbert Erdős
Andrea Bocskor
Andor Deli
Ádám Kósa
György Hölvényi

On the Jobbik list:
Krisztina Morvai
Zoltán Balczó
Béla Kovács
On the Hungarian Socialist Party list:
Tibor Szanyi
István Ujhelyi
On the Democratic Coalition list:
Csaba Molnár
Péter Niedermüller
On the Together 2014–Dialogue for Hungary list:
Benedek Jávor
On the Politics Can Be Different list:
Tamás Meszerics

Notes

References

Hungary
2014
2014 in Hungary